Blois-sur-Seille (literally Blois on Seille) is a commune in the French department of Jura, Bourgogne-Franche-Comté, eastern France.

Population

See also
Communes of the Jura department

References

Communes of Jura (department)